Dante Isiah Sealy (born April 17, 2003) is an American professional soccer player who plays as a forward for Dutch club Jong PSV, on loan from FC Dallas.

Club career

Sealy advanced through the FC Dallas academy, signing a professional contract February 26, 2019. The next day, he went on loan to FC Dallas's USL League One affiliate, North Texas SC, where he remained for the 2019 season. He returned to FC Dallas for the 2020 season, during which he made 11 appearances for the senior squad, scoring one goal.

On August 11, 2021, Sealy signed a two-year loan deal with Jong PSV, the reserve squad for Eredivisie club PSV Eindhoven.

International career 

Sealy has featured for the United States at the under-16, under-17, and under-20 levels.

Personal life

He is the son of former FC Dallas and Trinidad and Tobago international player Scott Sealy.

Honors

North Texas SC
 USL League One Regular Season Title: 2019
 USL League One Championship: 2019

References

External links
 
 
 Dante Sealy at FC Dallas

2003 births
Living people
American soccer players
African-American soccer players
American people of Trinidad and Tobago descent
Association football forwards
FC Dallas players
Homegrown Players (MLS)
North Texas SC players
People from Frisco, Texas
Soccer players from Texas
Sportspeople from Brooklyn
Soccer players from New York City
Sportspeople from the Dallas–Fort Worth metroplex
USL League One players
Major League Soccer players
21st-century African-American sportspeople
United States men's under-20 international soccer players